Vatsu Meru is a politician from Nagaland, India. In 2003 he was elected to the Nagaland Legislative Assembly of Nagaland, as the Naga People's Front candidate from the constituency Peren (ST).

References

Nagaland MLAs 2003–2008
Naga People's Front politicians
Year of birth missing (living people)
Living people